Tesfaldet Simon Tekie (born 4 June 1997) is a Swedish professional footballer who plays as a central midfielder for Hammarby IF in Allsvenskan.

Early life
Born in Eritrea, Tekie moved to Gothenburg, Sweden, as a nine-year-old. He started to play youth football with local club Marieholms BoIK, before joining Gunnilse IS in 2010. In 2013, at age 15, Tekie made his debut in senior football with Gunnilse, making six league appearances in Division 3, Sweden's fifth tier.

Club career

IFK Norrköping
On 6 August 2013, Tekie moved to IFK Norrköping, together with his teammate Ihab Naser from Gunnilse. In 2014, he was sent on loan to affiliated club IF Sylvia in Division 1, the domestic third tier, making 11 appearances.

In 2015, Tekie made six appearances for IFK Norrköping in Allsvenskan, being part of the squad the won the Swedish championship. On 19 July the same year, he signed a new three and a half-year contract with the club.

In 2016, Tekie made 26 league appearances for IFK Norrköping, that finished 3rd in the Allsvenskan table. He also featured in both legs as the club was knocked out in the second qualifying round of the 2016–17 UEFA Champions League, losing 4–5 on aggregate to Rosenborg.

Gent
On 19 January 2017, Tekie transferred to Belgian First Division A club Gent, signing a three and a half-year contract. The transfer fee was reportedly set at around €1.6 million. Tekie failed to make any competitive appearances for Gent, before leaving the club by mutual consent on 3 September 2019.

Loan to Östersunds FK
Tekie failed to make any competitive appearances for Gent. On 1 January 2018, he was sent on a one and a half-year loan to Östersunds FK in Allsvenskan. In February, Tekie played in both legs as Östersund was knocked out in the round of 32 in the 2017–18 UEFA Europa League, losing 2–4 on aggregate to Arsenal. He went on to make 15 league appearances for the club in 2018, before his season was cut short in September due to an injury. 

In 2019, Tekie remained with Östersund during the first half of the season, making 12 appearances, before returning to Gent in June.

Fortuna Sittard
On 9 September 2019, Tekie signed a two-year contract with the option of a third with Fortuna Sittard in the Dutch Eredivisie. In his debut season in 2019–20, he established himself as a starter for his new club and played 20 games, before the league was abandoned in April 2020 due to the COVID-19 pandemic in the Netherlands.

In 2020–21, Tekie made 33 league appearances, helping Fortuna Sittard to finish 11th in the Eredivisie table. On 30 March 2021, the club decided to exercise their option to extend his contract for one further season.

In 2021–22, Fortuna Sittard finished 15th in the league, one place above the relegation zone, with Tekie making 27 appearances. In May 2022, it was announced that he would leave the club during the summer at the expiration of his contract.

Go Ahead Eagles
On 8 September 2022, Tekie signed a one-year contract with Go Ahead Eagles. He made eight appearances in the 2022–23 Eredivisie, before leaving on 31 January 2023 by mutual consent after he had struggled to find motivation at the club.

Hammarby IF
On 9 February 2023, Tekie returned to Sweden and signed a four-year contract with Hammarby IF.

International career
Between 2012 and 2018, Tekie was capped for all Swedish youth teams from the under-17's to the under-21's, making 11 appearances for all selections.

He made his debut for the Sweden national football team on 11 January 2019 in a 2–2 friendly against Iceland, as a starter.

Club

Honours

Club
IFK Norrköping
 Allsvenskan: 2015

References

External links
 
 
 
 

1997 births
Living people
Swedish footballers
Sweden youth international footballers
Sweden under-21 international footballers
Sweden international footballers
Swedish people of Eritrean descent
Swedish sportspeople of African descent
Gunnilse IS players
IF Sylvia players
IFK Norrköping players
K.A.A. Gent players
Östersunds FK players
Fortuna Sittard players
Go Ahead Eagles players
Hammarby Fotboll players
Ettan Fotboll players
Allsvenskan players
Eredivisie players
Swedish expatriate footballers
Expatriate footballers in Belgium
Swedish expatriate sportspeople in Belgium
Expatriate footballers in the Netherlands
Swedish expatriate sportspeople in the Netherlands
Association football midfielders